Mario Jermen (born 2 February 1975 in Australia) is an Australian retired soccer player.

Career

After playing in Australia and Croatia, Jermen signed for PAOK, one of the most successful teams in Greece, where he made one league appearance.

In 2004, Jermen claimed that a metal plate collapsing in a gas station ended his career by causing a severe ankle injury. According to him, he was unable to sign for an Australian or Chinese club as a result.

References

External links
 

Association football forwards
Living people
Australian soccer players
1975 births
Sydney United 58 FC players
Wollongong Wolves FC players
NK Zadar players
PAOK FC players